Christina's World is a 1948 painting by American painter Andrew Wyeth and one of the best-known American paintings of the mid-20th century. It is a tempera work done in a realist style, depicting a woman semi-reclining on the ground in a treeless, mostly tawny field, looking up at a gray house on the horizon; a barn and various other small outbuildings are adjacent to the house. It is held by the Museum of Modern Art, in New York.

Background
The woman in the painting is Anna Christina Olson (May 3, 1893 – January 27, 1968). Anna had a degenerative muscular disorder which meant that she had not been able to walk since she was a young child. She was firmly against using a wheelchair, so she would crawl everywhere. Wyeth was inspired to create the painting when he saw her crawling across a field while he was watching from a window in the house. He had a summer home in the area and was on friendly terms with Olson, using her and her younger brother as the subjects of paintings from 1940 to 1968. Olson was the inspiration and subject of the painting, but she was not the primary model; Wyeth's wife Betsy posed as the torso of the painting. Olson was 55 at the time that Wyeth created the work.

The house depicted in the painting is known as the Olson House in Cushing, Maine, and is open to the public, operated by the Farnsworth Art Museum. It is a National Historic Landmark and has been restored to match its appearance in the painting, although Wyeth separated the house from its barn and changed the lay of the land for the painting.

Reception and history
Christina's World was first exhibited at the Macbeth Gallery in Manhattan in 1948. It received little attention from critics at the time, but Alfred Barr, the founding director of the Museum of Modern Art (MoMA), bought the painting for $1,800 (equivalent to $ in  dollars). He promoted it at MoMA and it gradually grew in popularity over the years. Today, it is considered an icon of American art and is rarely loaned out by the museum.

In popular culture
In Arthur C. Clarke's novel 2001: A Space Odyssey, Christina's World is one of the two paintings (the other one being Vincent van Gogh's Bridge at Arles) hanging on the living room wall of "an elegant, anonymous hotel suite" to which the astronaut David Bowman is transported after passing through the Star Gate. It does not appear in the film adaptation directed by Stanley Kubrick. The painting is also part of the sci-fi film Oblivion (2013), paying homage to the book 2001: A Space Odyssey.

The life of Olson and her encounter with Wyeth is portrayed in  the novel A Piece of the World by Christina Baker Kline.

A scene in the 1994 film Forrest Gump was inspired by the painting. When Jenny returns home, she throws herself on the ground and mirrors Olson's pose in reverse.

The painting was used as inspiration for the "Farmhouse" chapter in the 2020 video game The Last of Us Part II.

The painting is referenced in the 2020 film I'm Thinking of Ending Things.

The painting is referenced in the season 4 episode of Atlanta "Andrew Wyeth. Alfred's World".

The painting is referenced in Ethel Cain's music video for the 2022 song "American Teenager."

References

External links
 
 

1948 paintings
Paintings by Andrew Wyeth
Paintings in the collection of the Museum of Modern Art (New York City)
Women in art